Major Desmond Evelyn Longe, MC, DL, (born. 8 September 1914 – died. 19 February 1990) was a British Army Major, S.O.E agent and Commander of the Inter-Allied mission, Eucalyptus.

Early life and family 
Longe was born the son of the Rev. Charles Longe of Spixworth Park, Norfolk, England and educated at Woodbridge School, Suffolk. Longe worked as a bank clerk in Jamaica before spending the majority of his wartime service in West Africa, India and Vassieux-en-Vercors in the department of Drôme in southeastern France.

World War II 
During the war, Longe served in the British Army as part of the clandestine Special Operations Executive (SOE). He served in West Africa, Middle East, Far East and North Western Europe. Longe was the commander of the Inter-Allied Mission Eucalyptus.

Mission Eucalyptus 
In 1944, Longe was named commander of the Inter-Allied Mission codenamed "Eucalyptus." On the night of 28/29 June 1944, Longe and his team parachuted into a field in the French commune of Vassieux-en-Vercors in the department of Drôme in southeastern France. Their task was to train the Maquis (rural resistance fighters) of the Vercors Massif in the use of parachuted weapons and in guerrilla-style combat as well as seeking suitable landing and parachute drop zones for airborne operations. The mission comprised Commander, Major Desmond Longe and his second in command, John Houseman (codename: 'Reflection'), a former estate agent. Also aiding the mission were three subsequent officers, including 2 radio officers: Franco-American OSS agent, Andre Pecquet (codename: 'Paray') and Frenchman, Phillipe Saillard (codename: 'Touareg'). Longe located the mission near Saint-Martin-en-Vercors on 10 July 1944 where it was strengthened by three French officers, including Adrien Conus.

Eucalyptus immediately ran into difficulty. The SOE leader in southeastern France, Francis Cammaerts, was furious that Longe and his team had been sent to Vercors without his knowledge and permission. Moreover, Longe spoke little French and Houseman none, which limited their usefulness. The training of the maquis by Longe and others and air drops of arms and supplies proved inadequate when the German army launched an all-out attack on the Vercos Massif on 21 July and the maquis were quickly defeated and dispersed. After a few days hiding out in the forests, Longe and Houseman with maquis guides began a trek on foot to Switzerland and safety, crossing the border on 11 August. After their escape, rumors circulated that Longe and Houseman had fled in the face of the enemy. Longe demanded a court of inquiry which decided that his behavior had been appropriate and justified. However, Cammaerts refused to apologize for having said Longe "ran away."

On 19 July 1945, Longe was awarded the Military Cross.

Honours and awards

On 19 July 1945, Longe was awarded the Military Cross by King George VI for gallantry during active operations against the enemy.

Personal life 
Longe served as President of Norwich Union Insurance in the 1970s and later Chairman in 1980. Longe was appointed High Sheriff of Norfolk in 1975. In 1980, Longe served as President of the Royal Norfolk Show. Longe was appointed as Director of Schiedam Insurance, Netherlands and Director of Scottish Union and National Insurance Co.

Books 
Longe has been mentioned in the following books:

 Setting France Ablaze: The SOE in France During WWII (by Peter Jacobs)
 A Pacifist at War: The Silence of Francis Cammaerts (by Ray Jenkins)
 Fighters in the Shadows: A New History of the French Resistance (by Robert Gildea)
 Vercors 1944: Resistance in the French Alps (by Peter Lieb)
 In Search of the Maquis: Rural Resistance in Southern France 1942-1944 (by H. R. Kedward)

References 

British Special Operations Executive personnel
1914 births
1990 deaths
Recipients of the Military Cross